A by-election was held in the  Cork North-Central constituency of Dáil Éireann on Friday, 29 November 2019, to fill the vacancy left by the election to the European Parliament of outgoing TD Billy Kelleher of Fianna Fáil.

The election was won by Pádraig O'Sullivan, a Fianna Fáil member of Cork County Council. Sheila O'Callaghan was co-opted to O'Sullivan's seat on Cork County Council following his election to the Dáil.

Three other by-elections were held on the same day, in Dublin Fingal, Dublin Mid-West, and Wexford. The Electoral (Amendment) Act 204  stipulates that a by-election in Ireland must be held within six months of a vacancy occurring. The by-election writ was moved in the Dáil on 7 November 2019.

At the 2016 general election, the electorate of Cork North-Central was 81,609, and the constituency elected one Fianna Fáil TD, one AAA–PBP TD, one Sinn Féin TD, and one Fine Gael TD. The 2019 electorate was 85,524 (a 4.8% increase).

Among the by-election candidates were Senator and former MEP Colm Burke; four Cork City Councillors (Thomas Gould, John Maher, Oliver Moran and Fiona Ryan); Cork County Councillor Pádraig O'Sullivan; and three unsuccessful candidates at the May 2019 city council election (Sinéad Halpin. Thomas Kiely, and Finian Toomey). This was the first occasion Aontú (also contested Wexford) and the Social Democrats (also contested Dublin Fingal and Dublin Mid-West) contested by-elections.

In mid-November it was reported that Fine Gael's Dara Murphy would be resigning his seat in the same constituency in December, to become deputy chef de cabinet of European Commissioner Mariya Gabriel. The Irish Times reported regret within Fine Gael that Murphy had not resigned sooner, which would have allowed one single transferable vote  by-election to fill both vacancies, increasing the likelihood that Fine Gael would have retained a seat.

Result
 

The number of votes to qualify for reimbursement of election expenses was 3,179 (one-quarter of the quota), which was reached by O'Sullivan, Burke, Gould, and Maher.

See also
List of Dáil by-elections
Dáil constituencies

References

External links
Cork city returning officer

2019 Cork North-Central by-election
2019 in Irish politics
32nd Dáil
By-elections in the Republic of Ireland
Elections in Cork (city)
November 2019 events in Ireland